The Orphan of Ellis Island: A Time Travel Adventure is a 1997 children's novel by Elvira Woodruff.

Plot
The events of the story take place at Ellis Island, where a boy named Dominic, is on a class trip with his new class shortly after being placed in a new foster home, and eventually finds his way into a janitorial closet. He falls asleep because he is tempted to. When he wakes up, there is no students or anyone he knew who came to this trip in sight. Lonely and afraid, he picks up display telephones talking to the recordings that are the voices of immigrants who talk about their lives and their journey to America. Someone answers him but whispers and all of a sudden he has been transported back in time. He finds himself in Italy in 1908 on top of a green hill where he meets new friends named Antonio (7), Salvatore (10) and Francesco Candiano who are all brothers. They are poor and have no family. Dominic is confused and asks where he is and what year it is. The boys think he has lost his memory from the earthquake that recently passed. The boys instantly become friends and have adventures, encounter danger and even deal with loss as they are on their way to America.

Writing
Woodruff uses a combination of techniques to get accurate information for her books. She states: As much as I love and use books for researching historical projects, there's nothing like visiting the site of your story...I was visiting the Ellis Island Museum, researching my Orphan of Ellis Island, when I spotted a display of immigrant graffiti. My attention was drawn to what looked like a little goat with wings. That image stayed with me and not only gave me the character of Violetta, the goat in my story, but also brought the story full circle as my character scratches that image on a pillar at Ellis Island as he's waiting in line at the end of the story.

References

American children's novels
Ellis Island
1997 American novels
1997 children's books
Novels about orphans
Novels about immigration to the United States
Novels about time travel